Andrzej Stanisław Blumenfeld (12 August 1951 in Zabrze – 14 August 2017 in Warsaw) was a Polish film, television, and voice actor who worked for SDI Media Polska.

Filmography

The Young Magician (1987) - Teacher
Legend of the White Horse (1987) - Bartan
Dekalog: Four (1988) - Stawinski
A Tale of Adam Mickiewicz's 'Forefathers' Eve' (1989) - Writer
Kornblumenblau (1989) - Flecista
1968. Szczesliwego Nowego Roku (1992) - Major
Pierscionek z orlem w koronie (1992)
Prowokator (1995) - Struwe
Pulkownik Kwiatkowski (1995) - Army surgeon
Wezwanie (1997)
Kiler-ów 2-óch (1997) - Celejski
Thomas and the Falcon King (2000) - Balador (voice)
Prymas – trzy lata z tysiąca (2000) - Herbert
Where Eskimos Live (2002) - Taxi Driver
The Pianist (2002) - Benek
Zróbmy sobie wnuka (2003) - Apartment Owner
Pope John Paul II (2005, TV Mini-Series) - Gierek Edward
Expecting Love (2003) - Client
Idealny facet dla mojej dziewczyny (2009) - Milena's father
Little Rose (2010) - Malkiewicz
Ojciec Mateusz (2012-2014, TV Series) - Smieszkowski / Emil Grabski
Delivery Man (2013) - Mikolaj
Carte Blanche (2015) - Florczak
Bangistan (2015) - Wilfred
Persona Non Grata (2015) - Chaim Rosenthal
Bikini Blue (2017) - Blind Friend
Mute (2018) - Akim
Teatroteka: Sprawa Rity G. (2018) - Judge (final film role)

Dubbing roles

Animation

Television
 The Avengers: Earth's Mightiest Heroes - Leader, Mad Thinker, Man-Ape
 The Batman - Hugo Strange
 Batman: The Brave and the Bold - Kanjar Ro, Merlin, Slug, Despero, Shrapnel
 G.I. Joe: Renegades - Cobra Commander, Granger
 Hulk and the Agents of S.M.A.S.H. - Abomination, Super-Skrull
 Justice League Unlimited - General Wade Eiling, Ares
 Merry Madagascar - Santa Claus
 Spider-Man - Kraven the Hunter

Video games
 Afterfall: Insanity - Colonel Henryk Potocki
 God of War: Ghost of Sparta - Thanatos
 Gwent: The Witcher Card Game - Sigismund Dijkstra
 Infamous 2 - Joseph Bertrand III
 Syberia 3 - Dr. Helmut Mangöling
 Uncharted - Victor Sullivan
 The Witcher -  Jacques de Aldersberg
 The Witcher 2: Assassins of Kings - Additional voices
 The Witcher 3: Wild Hunt - Sigismund Dijkstra

References

External links
 
 
 

1951 births
2017 deaths
Polish male voice actors
Polish male film actors
Polish male stage actors
Polish male television actors
20th-century Polish male actors
21st-century Polish male actors
People from Zabrze
Deaths from cancer in Poland